Antebellum, Latin for "before war", may refer to:

United States history
 Antebellum South, the pre-American Civil War period in the Southern US
 Antebellum Georgia
 Antebellum South Carolina
 Antebellum Virginia
 Antebellum architecture

Other uses
 Antebellum (film), a 2020 American film
 Lady Antebellum, former name of American country music group Lady A
 "Antebellum", a song by The Human Abstract, from the album Digital Veil, 2011

See also

 
 
 History of the Southern United States
 History of the United States (1789–1849)
 History of the United States (1849–1865)
 Status quo ante bellum, a Latin phrase meaning "the status before the war"
 Bellum (disambiguation)